The 46th Infantry Regiment, later the 5th Podhale Rifles Infantry Regiment was a military unit of the Polish Army active during the Polish-Bolshevist War of 1920.

Initially formed in Italy and France as part of Gen. Józef Haller's Blue Army, it received the name of 4th Polish Rifles Regiment. It reached Poland in May 1919 and was integrated with the rest of the Polish Army, under a new name and number (46th Infantry Regiment).

It took part in many battles of the Polish-Bolshevist War, notably the Battle of Radzymin, where its 1st battalion broke under enemy fire and allowed the Soviets to capture the strategically important town, which led to a three-days-long battle for Radzymin. After the war, in October 1921 it was reformed into the 5th Podhale Rifles Infantry Regiment, part of the Podhale Rifles mountain infantry units.

The original regiment was in no way related to the 46th Infantry Regiment of the Polish People's Army formed in Gliwice in 1945 as part of the 13th Infantry Division.

Infantry regiments of Poland
Lwów Voivodeship